The Szkarpawa is a distributary river in the Vistula delta of northern Poland. It branches off the Vistula near Drewnica and flows eastward to the Vistula Lagoon at Osłonka. In the past it was known as Wisła Elbląska (English translation: Elbląg Vistula)

0Szkarpawa
Rivers of Poland
Rivers of Pomeranian Voivodeship